The 1987 Santiago de Chuco earthquake struck Peru on October 2 with a moment magnitude of 5.6 and a maximum Mercalli intensity of VII (Very strong). The shock killed three people and caused damage to homes in the titular province.

References

External links

Santiago De Chuco Earthquake, 1987
Santiago De Chuco Earthquake, 1987
Earthquakes in Peru
October 1987 events in South America
1987 disasters in Peru